Karen McCluskey (née Simonds) is a fictional character from the ABC television series Desperate Housewives. The role was played by Kathryn Joosten, who won the Primetime Emmy Award twice for Outstanding Guest Actress in a Comedy Series in 2005 and 2008. In the series finale, Karen succumbs to cancer. This was agreed upon between Marc Cherry and Kathryn since she was battling cancer in real life as well. Kathryn Joosten died 20 days after the series finale aired.

History

Past
Karen Simonds was born in 1943. She has two sisters: Gale and Roberta (Lily Tomlin). Karen's personality resembles of their mother. She reveals to Robin Gallagher (Julie Benz) that she was a model of corset for Sears Roebuck, which put her through college.

In 1963 she became the second wife to already once divorced Gilbert McCluskey (John Harnagel). He always suspected that Karen had an affair with his brother, but he could have mistaken him with her boyfriend from college. They moved into Fairview, 4358 Wisteria Lane in 1982. They had a child. It was a boy but he died when he was 12 years old, for an unknown reason.

Gilbert neglected to update his pension files, leaving all of his assets to his first wife, to whom he was only married for two years before divorcing her. He died in 1997. Karen kept his body in a freezer in her basement for the next 10 years.

Season 1
Karen McCluskey becomes the neighborhood nemesis of Lynette Scavo. In the season one episode "Live Alone and Like It", it is revealed she suffers from severe arthritis. Lynette helps her when she collapses and soon after they become good friends. Known as the bickering old woman of the neighborhood, Karen can be constantly known for bickering and causing ruckus, although she is a well intentioned person. It is revealed that she had a son that died when he was twelve. She offers to babysit the Scavo kids only to be sent home because Lynette finds her to be 'ancient'.

Season 2
On one occasion, Karen accidentally tasers Lynette's co-worker Stu when she believes he was trying to "abduct" Lynette's kids (which was actually a scenario staged by Lynette and Stu to try to teach the kids about stranger danger). She is also one of the first to become aware of Danielle Van de Kamp's relationship with Matthew Applewhite, catching them making out at the county park. In episode 15 of season 2, she finds Bree passed out on the front lawn after drinking heavily. She subsequently alerts Lynette that Bree had been drinking while babysitting her kids. Bree's drinking problems inadvertently improve Karen's relationship with Lynette, as she now frequently babysits the Scavo kids. Towards the end of Season 2 she supports Lynette after Lynette follows Tom to Atlantic City in a bid to find out the truth behind Tom's supposed infidelity.

Season 3
Karen emerges as a more prominent and visible character in Season 3, often involved in social roles with members of Wisteria Lane and even forming a friendship with Edie Britt. It has also been notable that due to the very separate story that Bree has in this season, Karen is often seen gathering with the other three main housewives Lynette Scavo, Gabrielle Solis and Susan Mayer. She also returns Mike Delfino his toolbox when he returns home from being hospitalized (which later gets him arrested despite her hiding it), and helps Lynette form a protest against the suspected pedophile Art Shephard.

In the episode "Liaisons", it is revealed that Karen has her own secret: she has the dead body of her husband, Gilbert, stored in a chest freezer in her basement. In the following episode, "God, That's Good" Karen breaks her arm, and is taken to the hospital. In the meantime, first Parker Scavo, then Ida Greenberg discover Gilbert's dead body. Karen manages to persuade Parker to keep quiet, but Ida goes to the police, and Karen is briefly jailed for improper disposal of a body. Karen becomes the subject of rumormongering as a result. She becomes hassled by local kids who throw eggs at her house, and paint 'Witch' on her door, and Lynette temporarily changes babysitters to keep her away from her children, although Parker continues to defend her and tells Karen to just tell the truth to stop the rumors. After some time, Karen decides to come clean, approaching the other Wisteria Lane residents as they are cleaning up after the birthday party for Edie's son Travers. As she explains, she came home from a weekend away and found Gilbert dead, and while preparing to call an undertaker, she checked his pension plan to see he had signed everything off to his first wife. Out of fear of being left broke, Karen kept Gilbert's body in the freezer and kept cashing the checks. Lynette then re-hires Karen as her babysitter, though Karen warns that she will need a raise.

Season 4
Karen almost foils Edie's fake suicide plan when she stops Carlos to complain to him about the garbage he left out being late, but notices her at the last minute. Later at Katherine Mayfair's barbecue, she questions Katherine as to why she left town twelve years ago without saying any goodbyes to anyone and Katherine is shocked that she remembers so much. It is revealed that Karen used to babysit Dylan Mayfair, and knew something about her father, even though Dylan insists her father left her when she was a baby.

Karen later gives her opinion on new neighbors Bob Hunter and Lee McDermott's water fountain, viewing it as a nuisance. When Katherine and Lynette both run for president of the homeowner's association, Karen casts her vote for Lynette although Katherine wins anyway.

When a tornado hits Wisteria Lane in "Something's Coming", Karen reluctantly invites the Scavos to take shelter in her house. But when she invites Ida and her pet cat Toby to also take shelter, things get complicated as Tom is allergic to cats. So Lynette tries to smuggle Toby out of the house. When Karen catches Lynette smuggling Toby from the basement, Lynette angrily accuses her of choosing a cat over Tom. Suddenly the door blows open and Toby escapes. As Karen tries to get Toby back into her house, Lynette catches her and then they see the tornado coming. They try to get back into the house, but when things block their way, they take refuge in Lynette's bathtub. After the tornado passes, they step outside, only to find Mrs. McCluskey's house in ruins. Although Tom and the Scavo kids miraculously survive, Ida is killed. As Lynette and Karen pack Ida's belongings in "Welcome to Kanagawa", they think of spreading the ashes at a baseball stadium where Ida used to play, but things get complicated as Ida's niece and nephew want to take the urn back to Omaha, Nebraska. Rather than let Ida's family get their way, Karen and Lynette switch Ida's ashes for dust from a vacuum cleaner. Later that night, Mrs. McCluskey and Lynette break into the baseball stadium and spread Ida's ashes around the field, but get caught by the police. The police let Mrs. McCluskey and Lynette off with a warning. Karen almost had her third strike as she and Lynette know that it wouldn't be enough.

In the season finale "Free" the show skips five years later and by this time Karen would be 69.

Five-year jump
Karen is shown to still be a gossip-loving resident on Wisteria Lane, and is also shown to be very healthy (much to Edie's shock).

Season 5
After the five-year leap for the fifth season, Karen is shown to be alive and well. When Edie returns to Fairview with her new husband, Dave Williams (Neal McDonough), Karen welcomes her back and teases her like they used to do. When Edie gets upset, Dave asks Karen to stop, but she refuses. As retaliation, Dave abducts her cat Toby, and refuses to return him until she apologizes to Edie. Karen's suspicions of Dave grow, and she enlists the help of Katherine to find out more information.

A few episodes later, it's Karen's 70th birthday and the residents organize a surprise party for her at Susan's house. However, when Dave breaks into Karen's house and moves stuff around in order to annoy her, Karen arrives at the party with a baseball bat. She goes to attack Dave but is stopped, and taken away in an ambulance. In the hospital, Edie visits her and Karen apologizes, claiming her pills had made her attack Dave. After Edie leaves, Karen reveals it was all an act and calls her sister Roberta, asking her to come over. Together they try to find out about Dave's past, and they discover he was a patient of a psychiatrist,  Dr. Samuel Heller. When they visit, however, Dr. Heller is not there, Dave having killed him in the storage room of the White Horse Club before burning down the building to cover it up, and Roberta tells Karen she cannot help anymore and leaves. In the eighteenth episode of the season, Karen hangs out with Edie, who tells Karen about how Dave lost his wife and daughter in a car accident. Karen apologizes, saying she wouldn't have done what she did to Dave if she knew that as she lost a child herself and knows what it can do to a person.

In the following episode, Edie dies in a car accident after she runs into a utility pole trying to avoid Orson Hodge and is electrocuted. Karen, along with Susan, Gabrielle, Bree and Lynette, is asked by Dave to take her ashes to her son Travers. When they  tell Travers about the death, he is not visibly upset, saying Edie  was not a good mom and did not even attempt to raise him. Angry, Karen tells Travers about how some years back, Edie comforted Karen on the anniversary of her son's death and  told her that she wanted Travers to be brought up properly and she knew she wouldn't have been a good mother to him. Travers then becomes upset over her death and tells the ladies to take the ashes. Karen, being the closest to Edie, tries to figure out what to do with the ashes when suddenly her front door gently blows open. Karen comes up with the idea to spread Edie's ashes through the neighborhood.

In the fifth-season finale, Karen and Roberta again try to find out more information about Dave by breaking into Edie's house after Roberta gets a call from Dr. Heller's receptionist saying he died in the fire. Karen and Roberta are caught by the police and taken to the station, where they discover Dave's ex-wife and daughter were killed in the accident that involved Mike and Susan. Roberta then mentions how freaky it was that Dave changed his name and went to live near the people who were involved with his loved ones' deaths.

Season 6
Karen is given a love interest this season named Roy Bender (Orson Bean). When Gaby offers to collect Karen from the grocery store, Karen spends the whole time in the car talking about her sex life with Roy. She later watches as Julie Mayer fights with her new neighbor Danny Bolen on the street.

When Julie is subsequently attacked and ends up in a coma, Karen is initially hesitant to tell the police about the altercation between Julie and Danny. Roy convinces her to go through with it, rationalizing that she doesn't have to do it alone, and using this as an opportunity to confess his love for her. Karen later watches as Danny is brought in for questioning.

Later, Karen visits Katherine at the mental hospital she is staying at, to encourage her to come back to Wisteria Lane. She later brings the housewives with her to convince her to come back.

In the sixth-season episode, "The Chase", Karen becomes engaged to Roy, and learns she has lung cancer. However, two episodes later in "My Two Young Men" we learn that Karen has already beaten cancer, and Roy throws a party for her, which all the neighbors of Wisteria Lane attend.

Season 7
Karen alerts the women of Paul Young's return in the first episode "Remember Paul?". In the fourth episode, Karen is concerned when Paul asks her to sell him her house because she might die soon. Later Karen tells Paul's wife Beth about Martha Huber and how everybody believed Paul had killed her. Roy returns in "A Humiliating Business" where it is revealed that he and Karen have now married, making him her second husband. She is knocked down in a riot, and is helped up by Lynette. She then lets Porter and Preston live at her house when Lynette tells them to find a place of their own, however their time is short lived as Karen kicks them out after they have a house party.

In "The Lies Ill-Concealed" Karen is visited by Felicia Tilman and is shocked to learn that she has moved next door. Felicia talks about the night she fled from Wisteria Lane and Karen recalls that she saw her and decided to keep the fact that Paul did not actually murder Felicia to herself. Later, Karen visits Felicia, and is surprised to learn that Beth was Felicia's daughter. She agrees to help Felicia keep an eye on Paul.

Season 8
Karen and Roy have an argument, and she kicks him out of the house, so Roy stays with the Solises. Soon, both of them realize that they miss each other, but Gabrielle wants to keep Roy in her house because he can control Juanita and Celia. Meanwhile, Karen is diagnosed with terminal lung cancer  and decides not to tell Roy  because he has lost a wife before. He eventually finds out and chides her for thinking he wouldn't be strong enough to handle this again, and they reunite. In the series finale, Karen is preparing to head to a hospice, but the women of the Lane insist on taking care of her themselves, making Karen realize how much they care for her. When she overhears Gabrielle and Carlos talking about Carlos killing Gabby's abusive stepfather, Karen decides to pay her friends back. She goes on the stand at Bree's murder trial and confesses to killing Alejandro herself, using details she overheard from Gaby and Carlos to convince the jury. While doubtful of Karen's story, the district attorney realizes the damage is done. The case is thrown out, and no charges are pressed against Karen due to her age and illness. Karen dies at home, listening to the song "Wonderful! Wonderful!" sung by Johnny Mathis. Then her spirit is seen joining those who have died over the years on Wisteria Lane. She is seen in the final scene of the show reunited with her son.

Behind the scenes
Kathryn Joosten mentioned on the talk show The View and subsequent interviews that Marc Cherry promised her not to kill off her character.  Joosten explained that Marc Cherry felt badly about all her previous characters being killed off.  In a subsequent interview Kathryn said, "Marc (Cherry) did not vow to not kill Karen because she was 'loved'.  He and I made that agreement when I came on the show because I'd just been killed off on a bunch of shows and I didn't want that to happen again." Joosten reported that Cherry came to her and asked her if she minded if he broke his promise and change her fate for the last episode of the series. She did not, but she mentioned to him that she wanted her opinion considered on the way it would be done. Her character, Karen, was eventually killed off but lasted until the series final episode "Finishing the Hat."
After frequently appearing as a guest star for the first five seasons, Kathryn Joosten was promoted at the start of Season 6, listed as "also-starring", but still is only credited for the episodes that she appears in. Due to a relapse of cancer, Joosten was absent for several episodes during the first half of the sixth season. Kathryn Joosten was promoted yet again, and starting with Season 7 is credited as "starring", but still only in the episodes she appears. For the eighth and final season, Joosten has returned to her previous status as "also-starring".
Kathryn Joosten was a two-time lung cancer survivor and was the national spokesperson for the Lung Cancer Profiles campaign on behalf of Pfizer.
Kathryn Joosten herself died of lung cancer just 20 days after the final episode of Desperate Housewives was broadcast. Her character died of the same disease.
Kathryn Joosten won the Primetime Emmy Award for Outstanding Guest Actress in a Comedy Series in 2005 and 2008, and received another nomination in 2010. In 2012, Joosten received her first Primetime Emmy Award for Outstanding Supporting Actress in a Comedy Series nomination, which was also her last Emmy nomination before she died.

References

Desperate Housewives characters
Television characters introduced in 2005
Fictional housewives
Fictional characters with cancer
Fictional attempted suicides